Three ships of the Royal Navy have been named HMS Onslow:

 , an  launched in 1916 and scrapped in 1921. She saw action at the Battle of Jutland under the command of captain John Tovey, later Admiral of the Fleet.
 , an O-class destroyer launched in March 1941. It was originally called HMS Pakenham but its name was exchanged with the above destroyer in August 1941 before its commissioning in October 1941. It was transferred to the Pakistan Navy in 1949 and renamed Tippu Sultan, and later Mufafiz.

See also
 , a Royal Australian Navy , which is preserved as a museum ship in Sydney, Australia.

References
 
 
 

Royal Navy ship names